Jimmy Adams may refer to:
Jimmy Adams (born 1968), former Jamaican cricketer
James Adams (cricketer, born 1980), Hampshire cricketer
Jimmy Adams (racing driver) (born 1972), American racecar driver
Jimmy Adams (golfer) (1910–1986), Scottish professional golfer
Jimmy Adams (footballer) (1937–2005), English soccer player
Jimmie Adams (1888–1933), American silent-screen comedian
Jimmie V. Adams (born 1936), United States Air Force four-star general

See also
James Adams (disambiguation)
Adams (surname)